The Gök River or Gökırmak (Turkish for "Sky River") is a tributary of the Kızılırmak in Turkey. At the past it was called Amnias. 
Its source is in Kastamonu Province.

The Battle of the River Amnias was fought in 89 BC between Mithradates VI of Pontus and Nicomedes IV of Bithynia during the First Mithridatic War.

Rivers of Turkey
Landforms of Kastamonu Province